Qntal is a German "electro-medieval" band founded in 1991 by Michael Popp and Ernst Horn. They later added vocalist Syrah (Sigrid Hausen) to complete the band. It has roots in Estampie, an acoustic band based on "authentic" Early music, whereas Qntal is a dark electronic "crossover" project. Michael Popp and Syrah are the principal members. Horn left the group in 1999, to concentrate on his other band, Deine Lakaien. He later formed Helium Vola in 2001. Philipp Groth (a.k.a. Fil) then joined Qntal. In 2008, singer and violist Sarah M. Newman (Mariko) left the New York-based band Unto Ashes to work with Qntal and Estampie in Germany.

The band's lyrics are primarily drawn from historical sources. Throughout their first three albums, lyrics were primarily in Latin, medieval German, Galician-Portuguese and a few other European tongues. On Qntal IV, the band added a few songs in English to their body of work. Two tracks from this album, Cupido and Flamma, reached the 2005 DAC, peaking at № 1 and № 8 respectively.

"Qntal" is an unknown word that appeared in one of Syrah's dreams. Pronounced by her as [kɑn-tʌl].

Qntal has headlined at significant goth and industrial music festivals such as Wave-Gotik-Treffen and M'era Luna. Qntal's debut U.S. concert took place in September 2004 at Dracula's Ball in Philadelphia. In 2007, 2008, and 2011 the band was featured in the Bad Faerie Ball at the Baltimore FaerieCon.

Discography

Studio albums

EPs

Compilations
 2008 – Purpurea: The Best Of, Drakkar Entertainment

Singles
 2002 – O, Tristan
 2003 – Entre Moi
 2005 – Cupido
 2005 – Flamma
 2006 – Von den Elben
 2008 – Sumer
 2017 – Music on the Waters
 2018 – Die finstere Nacht
 2018 – Nachtblume
 2022 – Winterly Waves

Special releases
 2006 – Qntal V: Silver Swan 2 CD; Noir Records Special Edition featuring artwork by Brian Froud

Compilation appearances
 1993 – "Por Mau Tens" on German Mystic Sound Sampler Volume IV, Zillo
 1993 – "Ad Mortem Festinamus" on We Came To Dance - Indie Dancefloor Vol. III, Sub Terranean
 2005 – "Ecce Gratum (Club Mix)" on Asleep by Dawn Magazine Presents: DJ Ferrets Underground Mix #1, Asleep by Dawn Magazine
 2005 – "Entre Moi Et Mon Amin" on Sleepwatching, Vol. 1 DVD, Asleep by Dawn Magazine
 2006 – "Von Den Elben" music video on Asleep By Dawn - DJ Ferret's Underground Mix #2 CD/DVD, Asleep by Dawn Magazine

Members

Current members
Sigrid "Syrah" Hausen (1991–present) - Vocals
Michael Popp (1991–present) - Vocals, vielle, saz, shawm, oud, tar
Mariko (2010–present) - Violist, backing vocals
Markus Köstner (2005–present) - Live drummer

Former members
Ernst Horn (1991–1999)
Philipp "Fil" Groth (2002–2014) - Keyboards, vocals, guitars, programming

References

External links

 Qntal Official Website
 Qntal listing at Discogs.com
 
 Qntal Official Myspace Run by Andreas Meck and Cypress

German musical groups
Musical groups established in 1991
1991 establishments in Germany